Esmelin Santiago Matías García (born December 6, 1981), known as Santiago Matías or Alofoke is a Dominican radio host and producer, record producer, celebrity interviewer, businessman and media mogul.

Career

Early life 
Santiago Matías was born on December 6, 1981 in El Capotillo, Distrito Nacional, Dominican Republic. He started recording rap songs from a young age in Capotillo and started his professional career in 2000, touring as the backing vocals for Vakero, a famous Dominican Rapper.

Alofoke Music media group 
While touring in many of the provinces of the country, Matías saw the lack of coverage of Urbano music or Latin Urban music in the Dominican media and the enthusiasm of the people wherever they performed, which motivated him in 2006 to start AlofokeMusic, a media group dedicated specifically to cover Urbano music artists in the Dominican Republic.

The company started with the AlofokeMusic website, in which he began uploading exclusive content about the underground rap movement and rap battles between artists and within months of its launch the website had thousands of daily visitors, which made Matías put a stop to his rapping career and dedicate his time to interview and write about the Urban artists. In 2013, he started Alofoke Radio Show, a radio talk show that interviews Urbano music celebrities broadcast on Power 103.7 FM and then on KQ 94.5 FM. The same year he started the Fuse Music record label and signed the Dominican-American rapper Mark B and positioned him internationally through collaborations with artists like Bad Bunny and Maluma.

In 2021, Ozuna and Santiago Matias bought Sonido Suave, a Spanish-language Bolero and Ballad radio station serving Santo Domingo, Dominican Republic. It was rebranded as Alofoke FM that same year and its format was changed to an urban contemporary format. It is now operated by Alofoke Music Group.

Alofoke Sin Censura
Alofoke Sin Censura is a segment of the Alofoke Radio Show broadcast on KQ-94.5 FM produced and hosted by Matías, in which he asks the artists that he interviews personal questions and their opinions on social issues. He has interviewed the majority of the most recent influential Urbano music performers from Dominican Republic and Internationally such as Anuel AA, Bad Bunny, J Balvin, El Alfa, Arcángel, Natti Natasha and more, as well as politicians like the Dominican vise-president Margarita Cedeño de Fernández, former Dominican president Hipólito Mejía and the Dominican presidential candidate Gonzalo Castillo.

In 2021 he denounced receiving threats from Venezuela after interviewing Dominican musician and culture Vice Minister Bonny Cepeda, where he declared that he received $60 000 to sing in a birthday party of the Venezuelan leader Nicolás Maduro, showing a WhatsApp screenshot where he received racial slurs.

Personal life 
Santiago's mother had him when she was only fifteen years old and his grandmother and an aunt helped her raise him. He attributes all he has become to them. Santiago started college studying Computer System Engineering and dropped out in his junior year to devote to music. However his mother made him study English and other computer courses, he later got involved in entrepreneurship.

Acknowledgments 
Youtuber del año - Premios Soberano 2020

References 

Dominican Republic radio personalities
People from Santo Domingo
Dominican Republic people of Spanish descent
Radio and television announcers
Living people
1981 births